Eleanor Boyle Ewing Sherman (October 4, 1824 – November 28, 1888) was the wife of General William Tecumseh Sherman, a leading Union general in the American Civil War.  She was also a prominent figure of the times in her own right.

Early years
Eleanor (nickname, "Ellen") Boyle Ewing was born in Lancaster, Ohio, the daughter of prominent Whig politician Thomas Ewing and Maria Boyle Ewing.  Her parents also raised her future husband, "Cump" Sherman, after the 1829 death of his father.

She was educated in Lancaster and Washington, D.C.

Career
She married William Tecumseh "Cump" Sherman in Washington, D.C., on May 1, 1850, in a ceremony attended by President Zachary Taylor and other political luminaries.  The Shermans, who often lived apart even before the Civil War due to Sherman's military career, had eight children together, two of whom (Willie and Charles) died during the war.

Although women did not have the right to vote in her day, Ellen declared herself to favor Abraham Lincoln in advance of the 1860 elections and was fierce in her pro-Union sentiment.  During the Civil War, in addition to her husband, three of her four then-living brothers became Union generals: Hugh Boyle Ewing, Thomas Ewing, Jr., and Charles Ewing.  In addition, Ellen worked to protect her husband's military standing during the war, especially in a January 1862 Washington meeting with Lincoln at a time when General Sherman's reputation was under a cloud due to newspaper charges of insanity.

Like her mother, Ellen was a devout Catholic and often at odds with her husband over religious topics.  Ellen raised her eight children in that faith. In 1864, Ellen took up temporary residence in South Bend, Indiana, to have her young family educated at the University of Notre Dame and St. Mary's College.  One of their sons, Thomas Ewing Sherman, became a Catholic priest.  She also took an ongoing interest in Indian missions and was credited as the principal organizer of the Catholic Indian Missionary Association.  In "the most absorbing and monumental work of her life," Ellen played an active role in U.S. observances of the Golden Jubilee of Pope Pius IX (May 21, 1877) for which she later received the personal thanks of the Pope.

Sherman died in New York City on November 28, 1888, survived by her husband and six of their children. She is buried in Calvary Cemetery in St. Louis, Missouri; her tombstone there identifies her as Eleanor Boyle Ewing Sherman.

Works
Memorial of Thomas Ewing, of Ohio (New York: Catholic Publication Society, 1873).
The William Tecumseh Sherman Family Letters (posthumous, 1967).  Microfilm collection prepared by the Archives of the University of Notre Dame contains letters, etc. from Ellen Sherman, her husband, and others.

References

Bibliography
Burton, Katherine, Three Generations: Maria Boyle Ewing - Ellen Ewing Sherman - Minnie Sherman Fitch, Longmans, Green & Co., 1947.
Carey, Patrick W., Catholics in America: A History, Praeger, 2004.
Ferraro, William M., "More Than a General's Wife: Ellen Ewing Sherman," Timeline, vol. 17, no. 1 (January–February, 2000).
Kerr, Laura E., William Tecumseh Sherman: A Family Chronicle, Fairfield Heritage Ass'n, 1894.
McAllister, Anna, Ellen Ewing: Wife of General Sherman, Benzinger Bros., 1936.
Marszalek, John F., “General and Mrs. William T. Sherman, A Contentious Union,” in Intimate Strategies of the Civil War: Military Commanders and Their Wives, ed. Carol K. Bleser and Lesley J. Gordon (New York:Oxford Univ. Press, 2001), 38–56.
Rahill, Peter, The Catholic Indian Missions and Grant's Peace Policy, 1870-1884'', Catholic University of America Press, 1953.

External links
Ellen Ewing Sherman, Wife Of General William Tecumseh Sherman
The Lincoln Log: January 29, 1862 meeting of Lincoln, Ellen Sherman, and Thomas Ewing
N.Y. Times obituary, November 29, 1888
William T. Sherman Family Papers from the University of Notre Dame
Thomas Ewing Family Papers from the University of Notre Dame
Sherman Thackara Collection at the Digital Library @ Villanova University
Catholic Encyclopedia information
Sherman House Museum, located in Lancaster, Ohio, the birthplace of Ellen Ewing Sherman and William Tecumseh Sherman

1824 births
1888 deaths
Eleanor Boyle
People of Ohio in the American Civil War
People from Lancaster, Ohio
Burials at Calvary Cemetery (St. Louis)
Catholics from Ohio
Ewing family (politics and military)